Lasva is a village in Võru County in southeastern Estonia. Prior to the 2017 administrative reforms of Estonian municipalities, it was the administrative centre of Lasva Parish. The village is now part of Võru Parish

References

Villages in Võru County